Aphilopota phanerostigma is a species of moth of the family Geometridae first described by Louis Beethoven Prout in 1917. It is found in the Democratic Republic of the Congo, South Africa, Zimbabwe and Ethiopia.

In Ethiopia the larvae of this species has been recorded as feeding on leaves of Catha edulis (Celastraceae).

Subspecies
Aphilopota phanerostigma phanerostigma Prout, 1917  (South Africa)
Aphilopota phanerostigma mweruana	 Prout, 1954  (Congo)

References
Prout, L. B. (1917). "New Geometridae (Lepidoptera) in the South African Museum". Annals of the South African Museum. 17(1): 47–77.

External links
 www.biodiversitylibrary.org Annals of the South African Museum, V.19,Plate XVI, fig. 66

Ennominae
Lepidoptera of the Democratic Republic of the Congo
Lepidoptera of Ethiopia
Lepidoptera of South Africa
Lepidoptera of Zimbabwe
Moths of Sub-Saharan Africa
Moths described in 1917